Orpiment is a deep-colored, orange-yellow arsenic sulfide mineral with formula . It is found in volcanic fumaroles, low-temperature hydrothermal veins, and hot springs and is formed both by sublimation and as a byproduct of the decay of another arsenic sulfide mineral, realgar. Orpiment takes its name from the Latin auripigmentum (aurum, "gold" + pigmentum, "pigment") because of its deep-yellow color.

Historical uses 

Orpiment was traded in the Roman Empire and was used as a medicine in China, even though it is very toxic. It has been used as fly poison and to tip arrows with poison. Because of its striking color, it was of interest to alchemists, both in China and the West, searching for a way to make gold. It also has been found in the wall decorations of Tutankhamun's tomb and ancient Egyptian scrolls, and on the walls of the Taj Mahal.

For centuries, orpiment was ground down and used as a pigment in painting and for sealing wax, and was even used in ancient China as a correction fluid. It was one of the few clear, bright-yellow pigments available to artists until the 19th century. However, its extreme toxicity and incompatibility with other common pigments, including lead and copper-based substances such as verdigris and azurite, meant that its use as a pigment ended when cadmium yellows, chromium yellows and organic dye-based colors were introduced during the 19th century.

Orpiment is mentioned in the 17th century by Robert Hooke in Micrographia for the manufacture of small shot.

Contemporary uses 
Orpiment is used in the production of infrared-transmitting glass, oil cloth, linoleum, semiconductors, photoconductors, pigments, and fireworks.  Mixed with two parts of slaked lime (calcium hydroxide), orpiment is still commonly used in rural India as a depilatory.  It is used in the tanning industry to remove hair from hides.

Physical and optical properties 
Orpiment is a common monoclinic arsenic sulfide mineral. It has a Mohs hardness of 1.5 to 2 and a specific gravity of 3.49. Optically, it is biaxial (−) with refractive indices of a = 2.4, b = 2.81, g = 3.02.

Crystal structure

Gallery of orpiment specimens

See also
 List of inorganic pigments

References 

 The Merck Index: An Encyclopedia of Chemicals, Drugs, and Biologicals. 11th Edition. Ed. Susan Budavari. Merck & Co., Inc., N.J., U.S.A. 1989.
 William Mesny. Mesny’s Chinese Miscellany. A Text Book of Notes on China and the Chinese. Shanghai. Vol. III, (1899), p. 251; Vol. IV, (1905), pp. 26.
 Fitzhugh, E.W., Orpiment and Realgar, in  Artists’ Pigments, A Handbook of Their History and Characteristics, Vol 3: E.W. Fitzhugh (Ed.) Oxford University Press 1997, p. 47 – 80

External links
 Webexhibits "Pigments Through the Ages: Orpiment"
 Babylonian Talmud Tractate Chullin see Rashi 'haZarnich' 
 Orpiment, Colourlex

Arsenic minerals
Sulfide minerals
Inorganic pigments
Alchemical substances
Monoclinic minerals
Minerals in space group 14